Christian Heinrich (born 13 January 1996) is a German footballer who plays as a defender for Fortuna Heddesheim.

Career
Heinrich made his professional debut for Sonnenhof Großaspach in the 3. Liga on 24 February 2015, coming on as a substitute in the 79th minute for Nicolas Jüllich in the 1–4 home loss against SpVgg Unterhaching.

References

External links
 Profile at DFB.de
 Profile at kicker.de
 Profile at Fussball.de
 SG Heidelberg-Kirchheim statistics at Fussball.de

1996 births
Living people
German footballers
Association football defenders
SG Sonnenhof Großaspach players
3. Liga players